Abdullahi Idris Umar is a former Senator that represent Gombe Central constituency of Gombe State, Nigeria. He assumed office on the 29 May 2007 under the People Democratic Party (PDP).

Early life and education 
Umar was born on 28th, December 1959. He received his Bachelor of Laws (LL.B Hon.) Degree. He preceded to the Nigerian Law School, Victoria Island, Lagos. He was appointed State Counsel to the Ministry Of Justice, Bauchi.

Political Carrier 
Member House of Representatives, Yamaltu deba 1999-2003
Member House of Representatives, Yamaltu deba 2003-2007
Senator Gombe central constituency, 2007-2011
Minister of Transport, 2011-2015

References

1959 births
Living people
Nigerian Muslims
People from Gombe State
Peoples Democratic Party members of the Senate (Nigeria)
21st-century Nigerian politicians